Borys Ivanovych Balinsky (23 September 1905 – 1 September 1997) was a Ukrainian and South African biologist, embryologist, entomologist, professor of Kyiv University and University of the Witwatersrand. Pioneer researcher in the field of experimental embryology, electron microscopy and developmental biology. He was author of popular textbook in embryology An Introduction to Embryology.

Balinsky was born 23 September 1905, in Kyiv, Russian Empire (now Ukraine). He was a student of Ivan Schmalhausen and one of the first to experimentally induce organogenesis in amphibian embryos. Balinsky was a full university professor and the deputy director of the Institute of Biology in Kyiv (now I. I. Schmalhausen Institute of Zoology) at 28 years of age. He became a recognized expert in fish and amphibian development. Being a victim of Soviet repressions, he remained under German occupation during World War II and fled to Poznań, Poland and later Munich, Germany. Balinsky briefly worked in Scotland in Conrad Hal Waddington's laboratory on mice embryology. Finally, he went to South Africa to become one of the founders of South African experimental bioscience.

Balinsky also worked in entomology and described new species of Plecoptera, Odonata and moths from the family Pyralidae, mainly from Caucasus and South Africa.

He died in Johannesburg 1 September 1997. He had a son John Balinsky who is also a scientist.

Insects described

Plecoptera 
 Pontoperla teberdinica Balinsky, 1950
 Pontoperla katherinae Balinsky
 Balinskycercella gudu Balinsky, 1956
 Balinskycercella tugelae Balinsky, 1956
 Balinskycercella fontium Balinsky, 1956

Dragonflies 
 Agriocnemis pinheyi Balinsky, 1963
 Agriocnemis ruberrima Balinsky, 1961
 Ceratogomphus triceraticus Balinsky, 1963
 Chlorolestes draconicus Balinsky, 1956
 Orthetrum robustum Balinsky, 1965
 Pseudagrion helenae Balinsky, 1964
 Pseudagrion inopinatum Balinsky, 1971
 Pseudagrion vumbaense Balinsky, 1963
 Urothemis luciana Balinsky, 1961

Lepidoptera

New species 
 Abachausia grisea Balinsky, 1994
 Acrobasis africanella Balinsky, 1994
 Afromyelois communis Balinsky, 1991
 Afromylea natalica Balinsky, 1994
 Afropsipyla pictella Balinsky, 1994
 Afropsipyla similis Balinsky, 1994
 Ambetilia crucifera Balinsky, 1994
 Ancylosis aeola Balinsky, 1987
 Ancylosis eugraphella Balinsky, 1987
 Ancylosis eurhoda Balinsky, 1989
 Ancylosis glaphyria Balinsky, 1987
 Ancylosis melanophlebia Balinsky, 1989
 Ancylosis mimeugraphella Balinsky, 1989
 Ancylosis montana Balinsky, 1989
 Ancylosis namibiella Balinsky, 1987
 Ancylosis obscurella Balinsky, 1989
 Ancylosis perfervid Balinsky, 1989
 Ancylosis similis Balinsky, 1987
 Apomyelois bicolorata Balinsky, 1991
 Arsissa transvaalica Balinsky, 1991
 Aspithroides minuta Balinsky, 1994
 Azanicola adspersa Balinsky, 1991
 Bahiria defecta Balinsky, 1994
 Bahiria durbanica Balinsky, 1994
 Bahiria flavicosta Balinsky, 1994
 Bahiria latevalvata Balinsky, 1994
 Bahiria macrognatha Balinsky, 1994
 Bahiria magna Balinsky, 1994
 Bahiria similis Balinsky, 1994
 Bahiria ximenianata Balinsky, 1994
 Cabotella inconspicua Balinsky, 1994
 Candiopella dukei Balinsky, 1994
 Cantheleamima excisa Balinsky, 1994
 Ceuthelea umtalensis Balinsky, 1994
 Cunibertoides nigripatagiata Balinsky, 1991
 Emporia melanobasis Balinsky, 1991
 Encryphodes ethiopella Balinsky, 1991
 Epicrocis abbreviata Balinsky, 1994
 Epicrocis ancylosiformis Balinsky, 1994
 Epicrocis arcana Balinsky, 1994
 Epicrocis brevipalpata Balinsky, 1994
 Epicrocis complicata Balinsky, 1994
 Epicrocis coriacelloides Balinsky, 1994
 Epicrocis crassa Balinsky, 1994
 Epicrocis flavicosta Balinsky, 1994
 Epicrocis furcilinea Balinsky, 1994
 Epicrocis gracilis Balinsky, 1994
 Epicrocis imitans Balinsky, 1994
 Epicrocis insolita Balinsky, 1994
 Epicrocis intermedia Balinsky, 1994
 Epicrocis noncapillata Balinsky, 1994
 Epicrocis ornata Balinsky, 1994
 Epicrocis ornatella Balinsky, 1994
 Epicrocis picta Balinsky, 1991
 Epicrocis plumbifasciata Balinsky, 1994
 Epicrocis punctata Balinsky, 1994
 Epicrocis sacculata Balinsky, 1994
 Epicrocis spiculata Balinsky, 1994
 Epicrocis vansoni Balinsky, 1994
 Eucarphia anomala Balinsky, 1994
 Eurhodope nyctosia Balinsky, 1991
 Euzophera crassignatha Balinsky, 1994
 Euzophera crinita Balinsky, 1994
 Euzophera cullinanensis (Balinsky, 1991)
 Euzophera minima Balinsky, 1994
 Euzophera termivelata Balinsky, 1994
 Euzopherodes capicola Balinsky, 1994
 Faveria dubia Balinsky, 1994
 Faveria fusca Balinsky, 1994
 Faveria ignicephalis Balinsky, 1994
 Faveria minima Balinsky, 1994
 Faveria minuscula Balinsky, 1994
 Faveria nonceracanthia Balinsky, 1994
 Faveria onigra Balinsky, 1994
 Faveria poliostrota Balinsky, 1994
 Flabellobasis montana Balinsky, 1991
 Gaana minima Balinsky, 1994
 Gaana quatra Balinsky, 1994
 Getulia maculosa Balinsky, 1994
 Hobohmia paradoxa Balinsky, 1994
 Homoeosoma masaiensis Balinsky, 1991
 Joannisia heterotypa Balinsky, 1994
 Joannisia jansei Balinsky, 1994
 Joannisia poliopasta Balinsky, 1994
 Joannisia semiales Balinsky, 1994
 Kivia longisacculata Balinsky, 1994
 Laodamia affinis Balinsky, 1994
 Laodamia glaucocephalis Balinsky, 1994
 Laodamia grisella Balinsky, 1994
 Laodamia homotypa Balinsky, 1994
 Laodamia hortensis Balinsky, 1994
 Laodamia inermis Balinsky, 1994
 Laodamia injucunda Balinsky, 1994
 Laodamia karkloofensis Balinsky, 1994
 Laodamia lugubris Balinsky, 1994
 Laodamia nigerrima Balinsky, 1994
 Laodamia nonplagella Balinsky, 1994
 Laodamia pulchra Balinsky, 1994
 Laodamia salisburyensis Balinsky, 1994
 Laodamia sarniensis Balinsky, 1994
 Laodamia similis Balinsky, 1994
 Laodamia spissa Balinsky, 1994
 Laodamia squamata Balinsky, 1994
 Laodamia zoetendalensis Balinsky, 1994
 Leviantenna ferox Balinsky, 1994
 Macrovalva quadrielevata Balinsky, 1994
 Magiriamorpha superpalpia Balinsky, 1994
 Miliberta gnathilata Balinsky, 1994
 Nakurubia sacculata Balinsky, 1994
 Namibicola simplex Balinsky, 1994
 Namibicola splendida Balinsky, 1991
 Namibiopsis punctata Balinsky, 1994
 Nonphycita lineata Balinsky, 1994
 Nyctegretis cullinanensis Balinsky, 1991
 Oncocera affinis Balinsky, 1994
 Oncocera cenochreella  Ragonot, 1888
 Oncocera dubia Balinsky, 1994
 Oncocera glaucocephalis Balinsky, 1994
 Oncocera grisella Balinsky, 1994
 Oncocera homotypa Balinsky, 1994
 Oncocera horrens Balinsky, 1994
 Oncocera hortensis Balinsky, 1994
 Oncocera ignicephalis Balinsky, 1994
 Oncocera inermis Balinsky, 1994
 Oncocera injucunda Balinsky, 1994
 Oncocera karkloofensis Balinsky, 1994
 Oncocera lugubris Balinsky, 1994
 Oncocera nigerrima Balinsky, 1994
 Oncocera nonplagella Balinsky, 1994
 Oncocera pulchra Balinsky, 1994
 Oncocera salisburyensis Balinsky, 1994
 Oncocera sarniensis Balinsky, 1994
 Oncocera similis Balinsky, 1994
 Oncocera spiculata Balinsky, 1994
 Oncocera spissa Balinsky, 1994
 Oncocera squamata Balinsky, 1994
 Oncocera zoetendalensis Balinsky, 1994
 Ortholepis polyodonta Balinsky, 1991
 Ortholepis pyrobasis Balinsky, 1991
 Ortholepis unguinata Balinsky, 1994
 Paralaodamia haploa Balinsky, 1994
 Paralaodamia angustata Balinsky, 1994
 Paralaodamia fraudulenta Balinsky, 1994
 Paralaodamia modesta Balinsky, 1994
 Paralaodamia pretoriensis Balinsky, 1994
 Paralaodamia serrata Balinsky, 1994
 Paralaodamia subligaculata Balinsky, 1994
 Paralaodamia transvaalica Balinsky, 1994
 Phycita attenuata Balinsky, 1994
 Phycita exaggerata Balinsky, 1994
 Phycita ligubris Balinsky, 1994
 Phycita randensis Balinsky, 1994
 Phycita singularis Balinsky, 1994
 Phycita spiculata Balinsky, 1994
 Phycita spissoterminata Balinsky, 1994
 Phycita suppenditata Balinsky, 1994
 Phycitophila obscurita Balinsky, 1994
 Phycitopsis insulata Balinsky, 1994
 Pretoria nigribasis Balinsky, 1994
 Proancylosis argenticostata Balinsky, 1991
 Pseudogetulia luminosa Balinsky, 1994
 Pseudographis dermatina Balinsky, 1989
 Pseudographis mesosema Balinsky, 1989
 Psorosa africana Balinsky, 1991
 Pylamorpha albida Balinsky, 1994
 Pylamorpha cristata Balinsky, 1994
 Quasiexuperius rhodesianus Balinsky, 1994
 Ramosignathos inconspicuella Balinsky, 1994
 Samaria inconspicuella Balinsky, 1994
 Sematoneura africana Balinsky, 1994
 Shebania grandis Balinsky, 1991
 Shebania maculata Balinsky, 1991
 Spatulipalpia monstrosa Balinsky, 1994
 Staudingeria mimeugraphella Balinsky, 1989
 Trachypteryx victoriola Balinsky, 1991
 Ulophora flavinia Balinsky, 1994

New genera 
 Abachausia Balinsky, 1994
 Afromyelois Balinsky, 1991
 Afromylea Balinsky, 1994
 Afropsipyla Balinsky, 1994
 Ambetilia Balinsky, 1994
 Aspithroides Balinsky, 1994
 Azanicola Balinsky, 1991
 Bahiria Balinsky, 1994
 Cabotella Balinsky, 1994
 Candiopella Balinsky, 1994
 Cantheleamima Balinsky, 1994
 Ceuthelea Balinsky, 1994
 Cunibertoides Balinsky, 1991
 Flabellobasis Balinsky, 1991
 Hobohmia Balinsky, 1994
 Joannisia Balinsky, 1994
 Kivia Balinsky, 1994
 Leviantenna Balinsky, 1994
 Macrovalva Balinsky, 1994
 Magiriamorpha Balinsky, 1994
 Miliberta Balinsky, 1994
 Nakurubia Balinsky, 1994
 Namibicola Balinsky, 1991
 Namibiopsis Balinsky, 1994
 Nonphycita Balinsky, 1994
 Paralaodamia Balinsky, 1994
 Phycitophila Balinsky, 1994
 Proancylosis Balinsky, 1991
 Pseudogetulia Balinsky, 1994
  Balinsky, 1989
 Pylamorpha Balinsky, 1994
 Quasiexuperius Balinsky, 1994
 Ramosignathos Balinsky, 1994
 Shebania Balinsky, 1991

References

Sources 
 
 
  
 
 
 

1905 births
1997 deaths
Scientists from Kyiv
People from Kievsky Uyezd
Ukrainian biologists
South African biologists
Soviet emigrants to South Africa
20th-century biologists